Aurore Clément (born 12 October 1945) is a French actress who has appeared in French and English language movies and television productions.

Early life
She was born Marie-Thérèse Aurore Louise Clément in Soissons. Following the death of her father as a young girl, she worked to support her family. For a time, she modeled in Paris. Since her appearance in Louis Malle's 1974 film Lacombe Lucien, she has  been cast in supporting roles.

Career
Clément has appeared in more than 80 films and is most often remembered as the character Anne in the film Paris, Texas (1984), which won the Palme d'Or at the Cannes Film Festival.

Her first appearance in a U.S. movie was in Apocalypse Now (1979), but her scenes—a long sequence involving French former colonists—were eventually cut from the film and restored in 2001 in the Redux version.

In France, Clément made her stage debut in 1988 with The Singular Life of Albert Nobbs, adapted from George Moore's short story, and won an acting prize from The French Association of Theatre critics. She has been in several plays, including Les Eaux et Forêts and La Dame aux Camélias, for which she was nominated for the Molière Awards (the equivalent of the American Tonys).

Personal life
Clément has been married since 1986 to Dean Tavoularis, a movie production designer.

Filmography

External links

1945 births
Living people
French film actresses
People from Soissons
20th-century French actresses
21st-century French actresses
French female models
French television actresses
French stage actresses